John Williams (17 February 1861 – 20 June 1922) was a Welsh Labour Party politician.

Williams was born in Aberaman, and began working at a local coal mine at the age of twelve.  Eight years later, he was elected as checkweighman, a post he held for twelve years.  He then became a full-time miners' agent for the Western Miners' Association. In this role he was a close associate of William Abraham.

A supporter of the Liberal-Labour movement, Williams served on Mountain Ash Urban District Council. In 1898 he was nominated as a candidate for Glamorgan County Council but declined to go to the poll.

At the 1906 general election, Williams was first elected as Member of Parliament for the Welsh constituency of Gower in West Glamorgan. He stood as an Independent Liberal candidate and won election despite being opposed by an official Liberal candidate. Upon election he took the Liberal whip and was active in the Liberal party's trade union group. When the Miners' Federation of Great Britain decided to affiliate to the Labour Party in 1909, along with the other Welsh mining MPs, he joined the Labour Party.

Death
He held his seat until his death in 1922, at the age of 60.

References

Bibliography

1861 births
1922 deaths
Liberal Party (UK) MPs for Welsh constituencies
Liberal-Labour (UK) MPs
Miners' Federation of Great Britain-sponsored MPs
Welsh Labour Party MPs
UK MPs 1906–1910
UK MPs 1910
UK MPs 1910–1918
UK MPs 1918–1922